Kirk Kilgour (December 28, 1947 – July 10, 2002) was an American volleyball player.

Other Work
Kilgour also worked as a consultant on Extreme Ghostbusters.

References

1947 births
2002 deaths
American men's volleyball players
Volleyball players at the 1971 Pan American Games
Pan American Games silver medalists for the United States
Pan American Games medalists in volleyball
Medalists at the 1971 Pan American Games
UCLA Bruins men's volleyball players